Anne-Lise Grobéty (1 December 1949 – 5 October 2010) was a French-language Swiss journalist and an author of short stories, poetry and radio plays.

Biography
Born in La Chaux-de-Fonds on the French-Swiss border, Grobéty studied literature at Neuchâtel University and went on to work as a journalist. She completed her first novel, Pour mourir en février, when she was only 19 but after her second work in 1975 she devoted an extended period to her three daughters. She returned to writing in 1984, with highly acclaimed works such as the novels Zéro positif and Infiniment plus and the short story collections La Fiancée d'hiver and Belle dame qui mord.

Commenting on her work, Grobéty explained: "I don't have a fashionable style. A long time ago I decided to work not on the busy high streets but in the back yards."

Works
Anne-Lise Grobéty wrote the following works:
 1970: Pour mourir en février, novel, Cahiers de la Renaissance vaudoise
 1975: Zéro positif, novel, Vevey, Bertil Galland
 1979: Maternances, poems (avec des gravures d'Armande Oswald), Neuchâtel, Éditions Galerie Ditesheim
 1980: Les Ramoneurs, poems, Lausanne, Payot
 1984: La Fiancée d'hiver
 1986: Contes-Gouttes, La Tour-de-Peilz, Bernard Campiche
 1989: Infiniment plus, novel, Yvonand, Bernard Campiche
 1990: Jours et contre-jours
 1992: Une bouffée de bonheur !, young adults story, Zurich, Oevre suisse de lectures pour la jeunesse
 1992: Belle dame qui mord, essays, Yvonand, Bernard Campiche
 1994: Non non ma fille : nouvelle, Orbe, Bernard Campiche
 1996: Défense d'entrer et autres nouvelles, Geneva, Éditions Zoé
 2000: Compost blues, Association suisse des libraires de langue française
 2001: Le Temps des Mots à Voix basse, young adults novel, Geneva, La Joie de lire
 2003: Amour mode majeur, Orbe, Bernard Campiche
 2004: Du mal à une mouche, Geneva, La Joie de lire
 2006: La corde de mi, novel, Bernard Campiche
 2007: Jusqu'à pareil éclat, Bernard Campiche
 2008: L'abat-jour, essay, Editions d'Autre part

References

Swiss women poets
20th-century Swiss journalists
Swiss writers in French
20th-century Swiss women writers
1949 births
2010 deaths
21st-century Swiss women writers
People from La Chaux-de-Fonds
21st-century Swiss journalists
Swiss women novelists
Swiss women short story writers
Swiss short story writers
20th-century Swiss novelists
21st-century Swiss novelists
20th-century Swiss poets
20th-century short story writers
21st-century short story writers
Swiss women journalists